Tatum Reed is a former American pornographic actress and adult movie producer. During her porn career, she created an Internet presence that featured her adult film career with blogging, fashion, and lifestyle reviews.

Adult film career
Reed has been acknowledged for her convergence of technology, fashion, lifestyle reviews, and pornography into a single lifestyle portal. After appearing in a handful of adult films and websites, Reed launched her own pornographic brand "IlovePopwhore", which eventually developed further into a reality based website. IlovePopwhore featured Reed followed by a camera crew in a series of reality series-style vignettes.

Reed and her pornography career were also the central focus of the 2007 James Hanlon documentary Popwhore: A New American Dream. The film won Grand Jury Prize for Best Documentary, and Hanlon won the award for Best Director of a Documentary at the New York International Independent Film and Video Festival.

Personal life
Reed is a conservative Republican and Episcopalian who voted for George W. Bush.

References

External links

 
 
 
 Popwhore Podcast
  twitter

Living people
American female adult models
American pornographic film actresses
American pornographic film producers
Women pornographic film producers
Pornographic film actors from Michigan
Film producers from Michigan
People from Bloomfield Hills, Michigan
American Episcopalians
American women film producers
Year of birth missing (living people)
21st-century American women